Jashpur Nagar is a town and a Nagar palika in Jashpur District in the Indian state of Chhattisgarh. It is the administrative headquarters of Jashpur district and was formerly the capital of Jashpur State.

Geography & Climate
It is located in the Chota Nagpur Plateau and therefore the climate is cool throughout the year except for the bitter winters, when temperature falls to 0 degree Celsius.

Jashpur Nagar is 12 km from the Chhattisgarh-Jharkhand border.  The two states are separated at this place by Shankh river.

Demographics
 India census, Jashpur Nagar had a population of 20,190. Males constitute 55% of the population and females 45%.  Jashpur Nagar has an average literacy rate of 71%, higher than the national average of 59.5%: male literacy is 75%, and female literacy is 67%.  In Jashpur Nagar, 13% of the population is under 6 years of age.

Festivals 
Dussehra is one of the major festivals of Jashpur Nagar. It is celebrated with full enthusiasm for nine days, followed by grand Ravan Dahan on Vijayadashami.

Notable Personalities 
 Dilip Singh Judeo
 Ranvijay Singh Judev
 Prabal Pratap Singh Judev

References

Cities and towns in Jashpur district